Tom Christensen (born 1966) is a former Canadian politician and lawyer. He has served as British Columbia's Minister of Aboriginal Relations and Reconciliation, as Minister of Education and as Minister of Children and Family Development.

Biography
Born in Vernon, British Columbia, he received a law degree from the University of Victoria in 1994 and was called to the British Columbia bar in 1995.

In the 2001 British Columbia general election he was elected a Member of the Legislative Assembly for Okanagan-Vernon representing the British Columbia Liberal Party. He was returned in the 2005 election with 43% of all votes. He did not seek reelection in 2009.

References

External links
Ministry of Children and Family Development web site

1966 births
British Columbia Liberal Party MLAs
Canadian people of Danish descent
Education ministers of British Columbia
Living people
Members of the Executive Council of British Columbia
People from Vernon, British Columbia
21st-century Canadian politicians